An election to Belfast Corporation took place in 1914 as part of that year's Irish local elections. This would be the last election before the Local Government (Ireland) Act 1919, which would replace the traditional FPTP based ward system with an STV system based on proportional representation. The election saw Unionists continuing their dominance of the council, winning a massive majority of the councils seats.

Sixteen seats were up for election, with a total of forty-eight candidates nominated.  Publican John Boston was nominated for every seat, in order to ensure that they would have a contest.  The Falls and St Anne's wards had the most candidates, with seven each.  Arthur Trew stood in both the Falls and Shankill wards.

After the election Crawford McCullagh was elected by the new council as Lord Mayor of Belfast.

Council composition by party

Results by party

Ward results

Clifton Ward

Cromac Ward

Court Ward

Dock Ward

Duncairn Ward

Falls Ward

Ormeau Ward

Pottinger Ward

St. Anne's Ward

Shankhill Ward

St George's Ward

Smithfield

Victoria Ward

Windsor Ward

Woodvale Ward

References

1914 Irish local elections
1914